Chitrella regina is a species of pseudoscorpions in the family Syarinidae.

Distribution 
The species is endemic to West Virginia in the United States. It is found in Greenbrier County in Coffman's Cave.

Description 
The female holotype measures

Original publications 
 Malcolm & Chamberlin, 1960 : The pseudoscorpion genus Chitrella (Chelonethida, Syarinidae). American Museum Novitates, .

Notes and references

External links 
 
 
 
 

Neobisioidea